María Esther Julia Arroyo Bermúdez (born Cádiz, 29 March 1968) is a Spanish actress and model. She was Miss Spain 1990.

Trajectory
Since winning the Miss Spain contest she appeared in many TV programs as a host (Homo Zapping) and collaborator (Sabor a ti) She also acted in many TV series, her most famous role was playing Ali in Periodistas from 1998 to 2002.

On 10 October 2008 she was involved in a car accident alongside singer Ana Torroja when another car collided with them. Her husband was the driver and she was the copilot. One of her friends died in said accident. She still has a limp due to this.

In October 2016 she became one of the contestants of musical impersonation show Tu cara me suena in Antena 3.

Filmography
Atún y chocolate (2004).
Los increíbles (Spanish dub) (2004).

 Won Miss Universe
 Won Miss Europe

References

External links 
 

1968 births
Living people
Miss Spain winners
Miss Universe 1991 contestants
People from Cádiz
Spanish female models
Spanish film actresses
20th-century Spanish actresses
21st-century Spanish actresses